The Sammarinese Rugby Federation is the governing body for rugby in San Marino. It oversees the development of the sport in the country.

See also
Rugby union in San Marino
San Marino national rugby union team

External links
Sammarinese Rugby Federation

Rugby union in San Marino
Rugby union governing bodies in Europe
Sports organizations established in 2005